The following is an incomplete list of experimental music festivals, which encapsulates music festivals focused on experimental music. Experimental music is a compositional tradition that arose in the mid-20th century, particularly in North America, of music composed in such a way that its outcome is unforeseeable. The Groupe de Recherches de Musique Concrète (GRMC), under the leadership of Pierre Schaeffer, organized the First International Decade of Experimental Music between 8 and 18 June 1953, and the phrase was used by musician John Cage as early as 1955. Afterwards saw the development of specific experimental musical instruments, which were featured at various music festivals. Musique concrète is an experimental form of electroacoustic music, and free improvisation or free music is improvised music without any rules beyond the taste or inclination of the musician(s) involved.

Related lists and categories
The following lists have some or total overlap:
List of music festivals
List of electronic music festivals

The following categories are related:
 :Category:Experimental music festivals
 Music festivals 
 Contemporary classical festivals 
 Electroacoustic festivals
 Electronic music festivals

Festivals

Bang on a Can Festival
Berlin Atonal
Big Ears Festival
CTM Festival
Festival International de Musique Actuelle de Victoriaville
GOGBOT
High Zero
How to Destroy the Universe festival
Music Biennale Zagreb
MUTEK
New Interfaces for Musical Expression
New Music America
Noise Fest
Noisefest
Norbergfestival
NWEAMO
Okuden Music
Olympia Experimental Music Festival
OM Festival
Other Minds
Psych Tent
TodaysArt
Unsound Festival
Warsaw Autumn

See also

List of experimental musicians
List of music festivals
Experimental music
Live electronic music

References

Experimental music festivals
Experimental
Experimental
Exper